Equestrian at the 1980 Summer Olympics was represented by six events. All of them, with the exception of the Individual Jumping Grand Prix, were held in the Trade Unions' Equestrian Complex, which is situated in the Bitsa Forest Park (southern part of Moscow). Individual Jumping Grand Prix was held in the Grand Arena of the Central Lenin Stadium at Luzhniki (south-western part of Moscow).

Due to the US-led boycott, only eleven nations competed in the equestrian events: Austria, Bulgaria, Guatemala, Finland, Hungary, India, Italy, Mexico, Poland, Romania, and the USSR. Therefore, only a few of the top riders in the world competed, including the Italian eventing team and the current European champion in dressage, Austrian Sissy Theurer. India also sent an eventing team, but all four of its riders were eliminated. There were 68 entries from 11 nations in the equestrian competition at the 1980 Olympics.

Disciplines

Show jumping
26 riders from seven nations competed over Viatcheslav Kartavski's course, including six teams, none of whom were dominating powers in international show jumping. The course was kept easy, with ideal distances between fences. Only sixteen riders competed in the individual show jumping competition, including one each from Finland and Guatemala. The Guatemalan, Oswaldo Mendaz, finished in fourth place after losing the jump-off for bronze to Mexico’s Joaquin Perez de la Heras. This remained the highest placing of a Guatemalan athlete at the Olympics until Erick Barrondo won an athletics silver medal in 2012. Silver went to Nikolaj Korolkov, finishing with 9.5 penalties, and gold went to Poland’s Jan Kowalczyk, who had a rail in each round.

Dressage
Of the 14 riders (seven nations) competing in dressage, there was only one top international competitor: 26-year-old Elisabeth Theurer on her Hanoverian Mon Cheri. She finished the Grand Prix an astonishing 35 points ahead of the second place finisher Yuri Kovshov, and 82 points ahead of the third place winner Viktor Ugriumov. She spread this margin even further in the Grand Prix Special, to 90 points ahead of silver and 136 points ahead of bronze. However, her win was not marred by controversy, and the Austrian National Equestrian Federation's President resigned after her decision to compete.

Following the boycott from west-block nations, the Soviet Union had to stimulate east-block countries of Bulgaria, Poland and Romania to take part in a team competition on a short notice. As a consequence, most of the participants were very inexperienced and have scored some of the lowest marks in the Olympic history. Without any significant competition, the Soviet dressage team won by a record 803 points ahead of the silver medal winning Bulgarian team. This was managed even without one of their top riders, Elena Petushkova, after her horse died from an illness.

Eventing
Only six nations competed, but with the addition of the 1964 Olympics gold medal winners (Italy) to the team fielded by the USSR (three-time European Champion), there was true competition. Endurance day was held in Bitsa forest park, over very deep footing, and included a 5500 meter Phase A, 3795 meter Steeplechase, 12100 meter Phase C, and a final 7685 meter cross-country course. Although the course was inviting, 11 of the 28 starters were eliminated.

Medal summary

Medals

Soviet Union dominated team competitions, winning gold medals in all of them. However they did not win any individual gold as Italy, Poland and Austria won the individual jumping, eventing and dressage competitions, respectively.

Events

Individual dressage

Team dressage

Three-day event

Team three-day event

Individual jumping grand prix 

Remark:for 3rd and 4th ranked contestants the standings are after jump-off.

Team jumping grand prix

Officials
Appointment of officials was as follows:

Dressage
  Jaap Pot (Ground Jury President)
  Jytte Lemkow (Ground Jury Member)
  Erich Heinrich (Ground Jury Member)
  Tilo Koeppel (Ground Jury Member)
  Gustaf Nyblæus (Ground Jury Member)

Jumping
  Eryk Brabec (Ground Jury President)
  Antoine Dumont de Chassart (Ground Jury Member)
  Viacheslav Kartavski (Course Designer)
  Giovanni Marcone (Technical Delegate)

Eventing
  Fabio Mangilli (Ground Jury President)
  Valentin Mishin (Ground Jury Member)
  Zdenek Tepli-Widner (Ground Jury Member)
  Viacheslav Kartavski (Course Designer)
  Anton Bühler (Technical Delegate)

References

External links 
 1980 Summer Olympics on IOC Site

 
1980 Summer Olympics events
1980
1980 in equestrian
Equestrian sports in the Soviet Union